North Shore Aerodrome , also called North Shore Airport and Dairy Flat Airfield, is a small, uncontrolled aerodrome located  south southwest of Silverdale, near Auckland in New Zealand's North Island.

Operational information 
Lighting (pilot activated)
Curfew 2200 to 0700 HR local.
 Jet A1/Avgas 100, Swipecard

The aerodrome is operated by North Shore Aero Club (Inc), which is a member of the Royal New Zealand Aero Club.

Airlines and destinations

Past operators of regular services through North Shore Airport were the North Shore Aero Club, NZ Air Services, Great Barrier Airlines and Fly My Sky, all operating to Great Barrier Island; Salt Air, operating to Whangarei and Kerikeri; FlightHauraki, operating to Whangarei, Kerikeri and Great Barrier Island; North Shore Air, operating to Tauranga and Kerikeri; FlyStark operating to Whitianga; and Sunair operating to Hamilton, Rotorua, and Tauranga.

North Shore Aero Club 
The North Shore Aero Club (NSAC) was founded in 1967, although flying occurred at the site before this. The club's primary trainer is the Robin R2120. Previously it was the Cessna 152. The club also has three Robin R2160s; this aircraft comes with a 160 hp engine and a larger rudder. One of them can be used for aerobatics. They have three Cessna 172s, one with instrument flight rules (IFR) capability. Their twin-engine aircraft is the Beechcraft Duchess, used for multi-engine instrument rating (MEIR) training. The club has Tecnam P2008 as the light sports aircraft. The chief flight instructor is Daryl Gillett.

See also

 List of airports in New Zealand
 List of airlines of New Zealand
 Transport in New Zealand

References

External links
NZAIP Volume 4 AD
New Zealand AIP (PDF)
The North Shore Aero Club Web Site
The Royal New Zealand Aero Club Web Site

Airports in New Zealand
Transport buildings and structures in the Auckland Region
North Shore, New Zealand